The Paris Peace Forum is a French non-profit organisation created in March 2018. The organisation hosts an annual gathering of world leaders and heads of international organisations, as well as leaders from civil society and private sectors and thousands of individuals from around the globe, on creating forms of collective action. The Paris Peace Forum completes the existing world agenda of multilateral gatherings by creating a specific event for global governance issues, as economic and financial issues are dealt at the World Economic Forum in Davos, and security issues at the Munich Security Conference.

The Forum's DNA is to be inclusive and solution-oriented. With this in mind, the forum showcases projects each year, coming from all around the world, which display concrete and efficient solutions to governance challenges. Focused on concrete initiatives, the annual event has been used as a platform for the launch of important, multi-actor initiatives, such as the B4IG coalition or the Paris Call for Trust and Security in the Cyberspace.

In a world requiring more collective action, the Paris Peace Forum is a platform open to all seeking to develop coordination, rules, and capacities that answer global problems. Its three primary pillars of activity include year-round policy initiatives and project support activities coupled by an annual event in November:
 Convening the world: Every year, the Paris Peace Forum convenes heads of state, leaders of international organizations and companies, and civil society organizations from around the world at its annual event to improve global governance.
 Boosting projects: At its annual event and throughout the year, the Paris Peace Forum showcases and accelerates emerging solutions through customized support by connecting project leaders with decision-makers, practitioners, and funders. Since 2018, over 400 projects have been featured, of which 10 annually receive one year of customized support via the Forum’s Scale-up program.
 Incubating initiatives: The Paris Peace Forum leverages its community of members and partners, as well as its privileged access to expertise and diplomatic networks, to launch and accelerate multi-actor initiatives providing responses to global challenges.

The Paris Peace Forum was founded in 2018 by Justin Vaïsse, as he was director for Policy Planning at the French Ministry for Europe and Foreign Affairs, to tackle global problems and strengthen multilateral cooperation. Soon after the first edition, Pascal Lamy was appointed President of the Paris Peace Forum, and Justin Vaïsse became its director general. The first edition was hosted in November 2018 at the Grande halle de la Villette, during commemorations of the Armistice Day centenary.

The fifth and most recent edition of the Paris Peace Forum was held on 11-12 November 2022 at the Palais Brongniart, focusing on preserving global cooperation in times of war.

History 
The Paris Peace Forum was born out of the principle that “a badly governed world would quickly become a world at war”, as explained by Justin Vaïsse, then president of the Forum. At the Meeting of Ambassadors on 29 August 2017, French President Emmanuel Macron spoke of the fact that peace is not something to be taken for granted, mentioning the Syrian crisis and the Ukrainian crisis as examples. In light of such developments, he called for the need to take concrete steps to strengthen multilateralism and preserve peace. Macron then announced the creation of the Paris Peace Forum on 4 January 2018.

Philosophy 
The purpose of the forum is to commemorate Armistice Day, as well as to “reflect together, propose concrete initiatives, reinvent multilateralism and all forms of contemporary cooperation”. President Macron and then-president Justin Vaïsse aimed at bringing together global governance actors, in an international and open space, in order to interact, discuss and generate concrete solutions. An important aspect of the Forum is the showcasing of projects from around the world. Each of these projects proposes an innovative solution to a specific issue. 

During the Forum, ten projects are selected as Scale-up projects to receive mentorship and support from the Paris Peace Forum for a one-year period.

Although initiated by the French president, the forum remains independent in its scope and funding. The event is financed by non-governmental partners, each of which cannot cover more than 10% of the costs.

Organisation 
The Paris Peace Forum is made up of three distinct governance bodies:

 The Executive Committee oversees and decides on the overall activities of the Forum. The Executive Committee is composed of representatives from the ten Founding Members, as well as persons elected by the General Assembly among the members of the Association: the French Ministry of Foreign Affairs, the Institut français des relations internationales (Ifri), the Institut Montaigne, the Körber Foundation, México Evalúa, the Mo Ibrahim Foundation, Research and Information System for Developing Countries (RIS), Sciences Po, the Foreign Policy Community of Indonesia (FPCI), Open Society Foundations (OSF), and the Aga Khan Development Network (AKDP). Pascal Lamy, board member of the Mo Ibrahim Foundation, leads the executive committee as president of the Paris Peace Forum.
In June 2022, it was announced that José Ángel Gurría, former Secretary-General of the OECD, will succeed Pascal Lamy as President of the Paris Peace Forum, starting March 2023.
The General Assembly is composed of representatives from: the French Ministry of Europe and Foreign Affairs, the Spanish Ministry of Foreign Affairs, the German Ministry of Foreign Affairs, the Institut français des relations internationales (Ifri), the Institut Montaigne, the Körber Foundation, México Evalúa, the Mo Ibrahim Foundation, Research and Information System for Developing Countries (RIS), Sciences Po, the Foreign Policy Community of Indonesia (FPCI), Open Society Foundations (OSF), and the Aga Khan Development Network (AKDP).
 The Steering Committee determines the strategy of the Forum, and is made up of international experts with specialization in various aspects of global governance, with balanced gender and geographical representation. The president of the Steering Committee is Trisha Shetty, and the vice president is Igor Yurgens. The other members of the Steering Committee are:
 Celso Amorim, Diplomat and Former Minister of Foreign Affairs, Federative Republic of Brazil
 Gabriela Hearst, Creative Director, Chloé
 Mahamadou Issoufou, Former President, Republic of Niger
 Yusra Mardini, Olympic athlete and Goodwill Ambassador for the UNHCR
 Mari Pangestu, Managing Director of Development Policy and Partnerships, World Bank
 Gabriela Ramos, Assistant Director-General for Social and Human Sciences, UNESCO
 Huiyao (Henry) Wang, Founder and President  of the Center for China and Globalization
The Circle of Partners which is made up of private actors who support the Forum. These are the benefactors, the institutional partners and the media partners.

The activities of the Forum are also carried out by:

 The Permanent Secretariat, based in Paris, carries out all operations related to the execution of the event. It is led by Justin Vaïsse as Director-General, and Fabienne Hara as secretary-general.
 The Selection Committee is responsible for selecting the projects that are to present at the Forum in November. They select the projects based on their relevance to the issue they are aiming to resolve, how innovative they are, the potential to scale up etc. 
 The Scale-up Committee is responsible for accompanying the selected Scale-up projects for the full year until the next Forum. Each member of the Scale-up Committee is an expert in a particular field of global governance and thus serves as a point of reference for one of the ten projects.

First edition: 2018 

The first edition of the Paris Peace Forum took place from 11 to 13 November 2018 as part of the Armistice Day centenary commemorations. It showcased 120 global governance projects and welcomed around 6,000 individuals over the 3-day period. German Chancellor Angela Merkel, United Nations Secretary-General António Guterres and President Emmanuel Macron gave speeches at the opening of the Forum. UN Secretary-General Guterres drew parallels between the political atmosphere then and the pre-World War I period and the ‘30s Interwar period. Merkel made similar remarks, noting that nationalism and populism were threatening European peace.

The Armistice centenary 

The commemoration of the 1918 Armistice was a recurring theme throughout the Forum. President Macron aimed for the Forum to bring about concrete proposals for multilateralism so that an outcome akin to WWI would not reoccur again. It was noted multiple times that the importance of remembering the Armistice stood in the comparisons that could be drawn between the 1930s and today. Similarly to statements made by UN Secretary General Guterres, Justin Vaïsse also highlighted the similarities, including: an economic crisis, closing of borders, commercial wars, migration and refugees, and a resurgence of populist and nationalist movements.

Themes and format 
The three day event presented a variety of formats, including debates, panels, round tables, masterclasses, workshops, project pitches, as well as a hackathon during which developers worked on financial data transparency programs. BrainDates from C2 Montreal was also present at the Forum to provide peer-to-peer learning sessions and small discussion groups for the attendees and the project leaders. At the center of the Grande Halle de la Villette was the Peace Library, a tree-shaped shelf structure on which heads of state and government each placed a book from their country that for them symbolized peace and international cooperation.

The overarching theme of the event was multilateralism: its importance as well as its shortcomings. The President of Niger, Mahamadou Issoufou, denounced the double standards of multilateralism, pointing out that African leaders do not have as strong a voice in the international scene despite multilateral decisions concerning Africa occupying a significant space in the agendas of international institutions. Among the other themes that were tackled were social inequality, with speakers such as Guy Rider, Lise Kingo and Jeffrey Sachs; the role of cities in the fight against climate change, with experts like Laurence Tubiana and Ariel Toh Shu Xian, who mentioned the critical role of science education, and Hindou Oumarou Ibrahim who spoke of its effects in the Sahel and more. The Forum also hosted the Declaration on Information and Democracy by Reporters Without Borders, with the presence of the representatives of Burkina Faso, Canada, Costa Rica, Denmark, France, Latvia, Lebanon, Lithuania, Norway, Senegal, Switzerland and Tunisia.

The Paris Call for Trust and Security in Cyberspace 
51 countries, 130 companies and 90 universities and non-governmental groups signed the "Paris Call for Trust and Security in Cyberspace", a non-binding declaration initiated by President Macron, calling for protection from cyberattacks. It aims to protect civilians, to keep external actors from interfering with elections, and to preserve intellectual property, and has been likened to a digital version of the Geneva Convention. Brad Smith, president of Microsoft noted for the New York Times, “Most of the world’s democracies are rallying around the need to protect all democracies from cyberattacks.“ The United States was one of the few Western nations that refused to sign the declaration.

Selected projects 
120 projects advancing concrete solutions were presented during the three-day event in one of the following categories: environment, peace and security, development, new technologies and inclusive economy. Out of them, ten were selected by the jury to receive support for a one-year period.

Attendees 

117 foreign guests attended the Forum, including 54 heads of state and government, 16 diplomats accredited to France, and 15 representatives of international and supranational organisations. What was also noted was US President Donald Trump's absence at the Forum, despite having attended a commemoration ceremony at the Arc de Triomphe on the morning of 11 November. Other attendants included French Minister of Foreign Affairs Jean-Yves Le Drian, Nobel Peace Prize laureates Nadia Murad and Shirin Ebadi, and Reporters Without Borders secretary-general Christophe Deloire.

Africa

  Ahmed Ouyahia, Prime Minister of Algeria
  Aurélien Agbénonci, Minister of Foreign Affairs of Benin
  Alpha Barry, Minister of Foreign Affairs of Burkina Faso
  Faustin-Archange Touadéra, President of the Central African Republic
  Idriss Déby, President of Chad
 , Ambassador of Chad to France
  Denis Sassou-Nguesso, President of the Republic of the Congo
  Alassane Ouattara, President of Côte d'Ivoire
  Ismaïl Omar Guelleh, President of Djibouti
  Sherif Ismail, advisor to the President of Egypt
  Mohamed Ali Suleiman, Ambassador of Ethiopia to France
  Régis Immongault Tatangani, Minister of Foreign Affairs of Gabon
  Alpha Condé, President of Guinea
 Mamadi Touré, Minister of Foreign Affairs of Guinea
  Uhuru Kenyatta, President of Kenya
  George Weah, President of Liberia
  Fayez al-Sarraj, Chairman of the Presidential Council of Libya
  Eloi Alphonse Maxime Dovo, Minister of Foreign Affairs of Madagascar
  Ibrahim Boubacar Keita, President of Mali
  Mohamed Ould Abdel Aziz, President of Mauritania
  Nasser Bourita, Minister of Foreign Affairs of Morocco
  Mahamadou Issoufou, President of Niger
  Muhammadu Buhari, President of Nigeria
  Paul Kagame, President of Rwanda
  Macky Sall, President of Senegal
  Danny Faure, President of Seychelles
  Nosiviwe Mapisa-Nqakula, Minister of Defence of South Africa
  Beji Caid Essebsi, President of Tunisia

Americas
  , Ambassador of Argentina to France
  Paulo César de Oliveira Campos, Ambassador of Brazil to France
  Justin Trudeau, Prime Minister of Canada
  Camila Marquez, chargée d'affaires a.i. of Chile
  Iván Duque Márquez, President of Colombia
  Carlos Alvarado Quesada, President of Costa Rica
  Martha Delgado Peralta, Vice Minister of Foreign Affairs of Mexico

Asia

  Nikol Pashinyan, Prime Minister of Armenia
  Elmar Mammadyarov, Minister of Foreign Affairs of Azerbaijan
  Tarique Ahmed Siddique, security advisor to the Prime Minister of Bangladesh
  Chea Sophara, Deputy Prime Minister of Cambodia
  Ji Bingxuan, Vice Chairman of the Standing Committee of the National People's Congress of China
  Giorgi Margvelashvili, President of Georgia
  Venkaiah Naidu, Vice President of India
  , Ambassador of Indonesia to France
  Kazuhiko Nakamura, Minister-Councilor at the Embassy of Japan
  Bisher Al-Khasawneh, Ambassador of Jordan to France
  , Ambassador of Kazakhstan to France
  Choi Jong-moon, Ambassador of South Korea to France
  Dastan Jumabekov, Speaker of the Parliament of Kyrgyzstan
  Saad Hariri, Prime Minister of Lebanon
  Mona al Baiti, Ambassador of Oman to France
  Moin ul Haq, Ambassador of Pakistan to France
  Rami Hamdallah, Prime Minister of Palestine
  Sheikh Tamim bin Hamad Al Thani, Emir of Qatar
  , Chairman of the Assembly of Representatives of Tajikistan
  Prayut Chan-o-cha, Prime Minister of Thailand
  Çary Nyýazow, Ambassador of Turkmenistan to France
  Sheikh Nahyan bin Mubarak Al Nahyan, Minister for Tolerance of the United Arab Emirates
  Nigmatilla Yuldashev, Chairman of the Senate of Uzbekistan
  Nguyen Thiêp, Ambassador of Vietnam to France

Europe

  Ilir Meta, President of Albania
  Alexander Van der Bellen, President of Austria
  Mikhail Myasnikovich, Speaker of the Council of the Republic of the National Assembly of Belarus
  Vincent Mertens de Wilmars, Ambassador of Belgium to France
  Bakir Izetbegović, Chairman of the Presidency of Bosnia and Herzegovina
  Rumen Radev, President of Bulgaria
  Kolinda Grabar-Kitarović, President of Croatia
  Andrej Babiš, Prime Minister of the Czech Republic
  Lars Løkke Rasmussen, Prime Minister of Denmark
  Kersti Kaljulaid, President of Estonia
  Sauli Niinistö, President of Finland
  Angela Merkel, Chancellor of Germany
  Alexis Tsipras, Prime Minister of Greece
  Pietro Parolin, Cardinal Secretary of State of the Holy See
  Márta Mátrai, First Officer of the National Assembly of Hungary
  Gudni Johannesson, President of Iceland
  Patricia O'Brien, Ambassador of Ireland to France
  Sergio Mattarella, President of Italy
  Hashim Thaçi, President of the Kosovo
  Raimonds Vējonis, President of Latvia
  Martine Schommer, Ambassador of Luxembourg to France
  Gjorge Ivanov, President of the Former Yugoslav Republic of Macedonia
  Carmelo Abela, Minister of Foreign Affairs of Malta
  Igor Dodon, President of Monaco
  Prince Albert II of Monaco
  Milo Đukanović, President of Montenegro
  Stef Blok, Minister of Foreign Affairs of the Netherlands
  Erna Solberg, Prime Minister of Norway
  Jacek Czaputowicz, Minister of Foreign Affairs of Poland
  Marcelo Rebelo de Sousa, President of Portugal
  Klaus Iohannis, President of Romania
  Vladimir Putin, President of Russia
  Andrej Kiska, President of Slovakia
  Borut Pahor, President of Slovenia
  Pedro Sánchez, Prime Minister of Spain
  Stefan Löfven, Prime Minister of Sweden
  Alain Berset, President of the Swiss Confederation
  Petro Poroshenko, President of Ukraine
   David Lidington, Chancellor of the Duchy of Lancaster and Minister for the Cabinet Office
 The Lord Bates, Minister of State for International Development

Oceania
  Sir Peter Cosgrove, Governor-General of Australia
  Epeli Nailatikau, former President of Fiji
  Winston Peters, Deputy Prime Minister and Minister of Foreign Affairs of New Zealand
  Tallis Obed Moses, President of Vanuatu

International organisations

  Moussa Faki, Chairperson of the African Union Commission
  Paul Kagame, Chairperson of the African Union
  Thorbjørn Jagland, Secretary General of the Council of Europe
  Pierre Moscovici, European Commissioner for Economic and Financial Affairs, Taxation and Customs
  Antonio Tajani, President of the European Parliament
 Guy Ryder, Director-General of the International Labour Organization
 Christine Lagarde, chair and managing director of the International Monetary Fund
  Jens Stoltenberg, Secretary-General of NATO
 José Ángel Gurría, Secretary-General of the Organisation of Economic Cooperation and Development
  Audrey Azoulay, Director-General of UNESCO
  Paolo Artini, Representative of the UNHRC in France
  António Guterres, Secretary-General of the United Nations
  María Fernanda Espinosa Garces, President of the United Nations General Assembly
  Roberto Azevêdo, Director-General of the World Trade Organization
 Jim Yong Kim, President of the World Bank

Criticisms 
The Paris Peace Forum faced criticism for having extended an invitation to Saudi Arabia, in light of the murder of journalist Jamal Khashoggi and the continuing war in Yemen. Due to similar contradictions, such as France's involvement in weapons sales, and nuclear armament, questions were raised as to the extent to which the peace summit was truly substantial or just an instrument of communication.

Criticism was also drawn to the event's funding, with contributions made, among others, by tech giants such as Google and Microsoft.

Some also argued that the Forum was homogeneous in its discussion, reserved for the elites who agreed with each other rather than including those who disagreed with multilateralism.

Second edition: 2019 
The second edition of the Paris Peace Forum took place on 11–13 November at la Grande Halle de La Villette, under the presidency of Pascal Lamy, who was previously President of the Steering Committee, and with Justin Vaïsse as the Forum's Director General. The Paris Peace Forum 2019 was attended by 7,000 participants, representing 164 nationalities. 33 heads of state and government were present, with official delegations from 140 countries. 318 project leaders representing 114 governance solutions from around the world gathered in the Forum's Space for Solutions.

The United Nations Secretary-General, António Guterres, the Mayor of Paris, Anne Hidalgo, and the President of the Paris Peace Forum, Pascal Lamy, spoke during the event's soft opening on 11 November. Guterres referred to the main global challenges of our times, by distinguishing five global risks: an economic and geostrategic polarization, a crack of the social contract caused by rising inequalities and protests, the loss of solidarity between communities and the rise of hate as a political tool, environmental degradation and the climate crisis, and finally, the risk of unchecked technology. The official opening ceremony took place on 12 November. Opening remarks were made by the French President Emmanuel Macron, the President-elect of the European Commission, Ursula von der Leyen, President of the Democratic Republic of the Congo, Félix Tshisekedi, and the vice-president of the People's Republic of China, Wang Qishan.

Format and themes 
The second edition of the Paris Peace Forum saw a number of new activities and formats, such as the Peace Game, organized by Foreign Policy and Körber Stiftung. A Peace Game brings together participants with the purpose of working out a crisis scenario through concrete solutions. Among the other formats participants were invited to attend, the '20 Questions to the World', and Braindates by e180, were particularly successful. For this second edition, last year's Peace Library, which gathered books gifted by high-level participants, took the form of a Peace Globe, where world leaders were given the opportunity to leave objects symbolizing peace.

Key initiatives 
Nine initiatives were launched and developed at the second edition of the Paris Peace Forum. These included B4IG, which started out at the G7 Leaders' Summit in Biarritz, and which is driven by Emmanuel Macron, the OECD and Danone in order to unite companies for inclusive growth. The "Alliance for Multilateralism", launched in April 2019 by the French and German foreign ministers, held a session on the governance of the digital sphere, which was moderated by the French Minister of Europe & Foreign Affairs, Jean-Yves Le Drian. Other initiatives included the inauguration of the Reporters Without Borders Forum on Information and Democracy, and the launch of the Indian Coalition for Disaster Resilient Infrastructure, driven by Indian Prime Minister Narendra Modi.

Third edition: 2020 
The third edition, hosted virtually from 11 to 13 November 2020, was chiefly devoted to the multi-actor response to the COVID-19 pandemic, with the conviction that all relevant actors can collectively overcome the enormous challenges faced by the international community and use the crisis as an opportunity to rebuild a more sustainable world. Macron hosted Senegalese President Macky Sall, IMF Managing Director Kristalina Georgieva, and European Council President Charles Michel at the Élysée Palace, while over 50 world leaders and heads of international organizations contributed video messages during the event, including New Zealand Prime Minister Jacinda Ardern, Italian Prime Minister Giuseppe Conte and Chinese President Xi Jinping.

In 2020 on a specially developed digital event platform, the virtual edition of the Paris Peace Forum counted 12,000 online participants representing 151 countries, over 50 heads of state and government, 117 hours of live broadcasting, 178 debate sessions and project pitches, and 100 concrete projects from around the globe.

Key achievements 
The third edition included three major achievements:
 The Finance in Common Summit, gathering 450 public development banks, whose funds represent over 10% of global investment. This first-of-its-kind summit led to a signed declaration to align their investments with the SDGs and climate objectives. 
 A coalition of states, international organizations and foundations (Bill & Melinda Gates Foundation, France, Spain, the EU commission, and other actors) announced a contribution of $500M for ACT-A, the accelerator for Covid-19 vaccines, tests and therapies.
 Leaders of the UN, IMF, Germany, France, Senegal and the European Union started a global conversation on the principles which shall guide the world recovery after the Covid-19 crisis. This political discussion has set up the stage for a new international consensus towards a fairer and more resilient paradigm to define the principles of the post-Covid19 world: the “Paris Consensus”.

Fourth edition: 2021 
The fourth edition of the Paris Peace Forum was dedicated to bridging global governance gaps. The second consecutive edition devoted to the COVID-19 pandemic, it was hosted in a hybrid format from 11 to 13 November 2021, promoting global coordination in times of COVID-19. The official ceremony on 11 November convened heads of state and government as well as NGO leaders and CEOs of global companies, headed by French President Emmanuel Macron, and including Nigerian President Muhammadu Buhari, and Bangladeshi Prime Minister Sheikh Hasina. The United States was also represented at the forum for the first time, via Vice President Kamala Harris.

In 2021, the fourth edition counted 15,000 online participants and a thousand present in Paris, whereas 45 heads of state and government and leaders of international organizations were among experts taking part in 74 debate sessions, and the Space for Solutions counted 80 projects from around the world.

Key achievements

The "Net Zero Space" initiative 
On the occasion of the 2021 Paris Peace Forum, actors from all over the world concerned by the long-term sustainability of outer space launched the "Net Zero Space" initiative. This new initiative calls for achieving sustainable use of outer space for the benefit of all humankind by 2030 by taking concrete actions to tackle the pressing challenge of reducing debris orbiting Earth.

International Call to stand up for children’s rights in the digital environment 
The Paris Peace Forum hosted the launch of an international Call to stand up for children’s rights in the digital environment. French President Emmanuel Macron and UNICEF, along with seven other states, a dozen non-governmental organizations, and most of the major digital platforms (including Amazon, Google, YouTube, Meta, Microsoft, Dailymotion, Qwant, Snap, and Twitter) signed this Call and committed to enabling children to use digital tools safely and benefit from their full potential without being exposed to abuse through a series of actions.

US and EU join the Paris Call for Trust and Security in Cyberspace 
The Paris Call for Trust and Security in Cyberspace, launched on 12 November 2018 at the Paris Peace Forum, is a call to come together to face the new threats endangering citizens and infrastructure. It is based on nine common principles to secure cyberspace, which provide areas for discussion and action. 
The Paris Call invites all cyberspace actors to work together and encourage states to cooperate with private sector partners, academia, and civil society. The 1,200 supporters of the Paris Call (80 states, more than 700 companies, 350 civil society organizations) commit to working together to adopt responsible behavior and implement within cyberspace the fundamental principles which apply in the physical world. 
As part of their participation in the 2021 Paris Peace Forum, Vice President Kamala Harris and President Ursula von der Leyen announced the United States and the European Union’s historic decision to support the Paris Call.

A new International Fund for Public Interest Media to enable the development, sustainability, and independence of public interest media 
The International Fund for Public Interest Media (IFPIM), launched at the 2021 Paris Peace Forum, is an initiative to create the step change needed to enable the development, sustainability, and independence of public interest media, especially in resource-poor and fragile settings. The Fund is co-chaired by Maria Ressa, 2021 Nobel Peace Prize laureate, and former New York Times President and CEO Mark Thompson.

Armed forces of 22 countries pledge to reduce climate impact 
The Paris Peace Forum brought together 22 defense ministers to discuss the "Climate Change and the Armed Forces" initiative. This roadmap, the foundation for a growing coalition, aims to reduce emissions from armed forces, mitigate damage, and strengthen cooperation between states in the process of adapting armed forces to the impact of climate change.

Fifth edition: 2022 
The fifth edition of the Paris Peace Forum will be held through 11-12 November 2022; attendants will include President of Argentina Alberto Fernández, President of Colombia Gustavo Petro, OECD Secretary-General Mathias Cormann and President of the International Committee of the Red Cross Mirjana Spoljaric Egger.

References

External links
 

2018 establishments in France
Peace conferences
Diplomatic conferences in France
Organizations based in Paris
21st-century diplomatic conferences
Emmanuel Macron